The Bovine Genome Database is an integrated database for the bovine genome.

See also
 Bovine genome

References

External links
 http://BovineGenome.org

Genome databases
Cattle